Silvestro Invrea (Genoa, 1530 - Genoa, 17 March 1607) was the 86th Doge of the Republic of Genoa.

Biography 
Silvestro Invrea was elected to the highest dogal position with the elections of March 3, 1607, the forty-first in two-year succession and the eighty-sixth in republican history. His dogate passed to the annals for the brevity of the mandate, only 14 days, the shortest after the reform of 1528 and in any case in the history of the doges of Genoa. Already in poor health, he assisted on the morning of the election to the praise of the Dean, only to then retire to his rooms without ever, in fact, ruling one day in the guise of doge. He died on March 17 and there was not even time for the usual and official coronation, an episode that was the first in the history of the Republic of Genoa.

See also 

 Republic of Genoa
 Doge of Genoa

Sources 

 Buonadonna, Sergio. Rosso doge. I dogi della Repubblica di Genova dal 1339 al 1797.

17th-century Doges of Genoa
1530 births
1607 deaths